The 2000 State Farm Women's Tennis Classic was a women's tennis tournament played on outdoor hard courts in Scottsdale, Arizona in the United States that was part of Tier II category of the 2000 WTA Tour. It was the inaugural edition of the tournament and ran from February 28 through March 5, 2000. The tournament finals were not played due to rain. The singles finalists, first-seeded Martina Hingis and second-seeded  Lindsay Davenport each earned $43,500 prize money for reaching the final and shared the associated ranking points.

Finals

Singles
 Lindsay Davenport vs.  Martina Hingis final not played

Doubles
The doubles competition was halted at the semifinal stage

References

External links
 ITF tournament edition details
 Tournament draws

State Farm Women's Tennis Classic
State Farm Women's Tennis Classic
2000 in American tennis
2000 in sports in Arizona